The 1990 California Angels season involved the Angels finishing 4th in the American League west with a record of 80 wins and 82 losses.

Offseason
October 6, 1989: Jim Eppard was released by the California Angels.
December 19, 1989: Mark Eichhorn was signed as a free agent with the California Angels. 
January 9, 1990: Scott Bailes was traded by the Cleveland Indians to the California Angels for Colin Charland (minors) and Jeff Manto.
February 3, 1990: Greg Minton was released by the California Angels.
February 5, 1990: Rick Schu was signed as a free agent with the California Angels.
February 21, 1990: Greg Minton was signed as a free agent with the California Angels.

Regular season

Transactions
April 29, 1990: Luis Polonia was traded by the New York Yankees to the California Angels for Claudell Washington and Rich Monteleone.
 May 11, 1990 – The California Angels sent Mike Witt to the New York Yankees in exchange for Dave Winfield

Season standings

Record vs. opponents

Roster

Player stats

Batting

Starters by position 
Note: Pos = Position; G = Games played; AB = At bats; H = Hits; Avg. = Batting average; HR = Home runs; RBI = Runs batted in

Other batters 
Note: G = Games played; AB = At bats; H = Hits; Avg. = Batting average; HR = Home runs; RBI = Runs batted in

Pitching

Starting pitchers 
Note: G = Games pitched; IP = Innings pitched; W = Wins; L = Losses; ERA = Earned run average; SO = Strikeouts

Relief pitchers 
Note: G = Games pitched; W = Wins; L = Losses; SV = Saves; ERA = Earned run average; SO = Strikeouts

Farm system

LEAGUE CHAMPIONS: Quad Cities

References

1990 California Angels at Baseball Reference
1990 California Angels  at Baseball Almanac

Los Angeles Angels seasons
California Angels season
Los